NS16, NS 16, NS-16, NS.16, or variation, may refer to:

Places
 Ang Mo Kio MRT station (station code NS16), Ang Mo Kio, Singapore; a mass transit station
 Dartmouth East (constituency N.S. 16), Nova Scotia, Canada; a provincial electoral district
 Paramaribo District (FIPS region code NS16), Suriname

Other uses
 Blue Origin NS-16, a suborbital space tourism flight on 2021 July 20 from Blue Origin
 RAF N.S. 16, a British NS class airship

See also

 NS (disambiguation)
 16 (disambiguation)